Elisabeth Eide  (born 22 July 1950) is a Norwegian journalist, teacher, novelist and non-fiction writer. She was born in Bergen.

Eide made her novel debut in 1994 with Til Kabul faller . Further novels (crime fiction) are Utviklingens hjul from 1997, Der mørket leker med ilden from 1998, and  Skyteskiver from 2000.

She received the Ossietzky Award in 2002.

Eide was an active participant in the Maoist movement in Norway, and was part of a delegation with AKP (m-l) that visited Pol Pot in 1978. She later left the Maoist movement.

References

Further reading 

1950 births
Living people
Writers from Bergen
Norwegian women novelists
20th-century Norwegian novelists
Norwegian crime fiction writers
21st-century Norwegian journalists
Norwegian non-fiction writers
Norwegian women non-fiction writers 
Academic staff of Oslo University College
20th-century Norwegian women writers